America's Store was a US shopping television network. It was the spin-off channel to the Home Shopping Network (HSN). On April 3, 2007, America's Store ceased broadcasting permanently.
 
America's Store (AS) began in 1988 as the Home Shopping Club Overnight Service, which aired on broadcast stations around the US from midnight to 9 am and, in particular, on WWOR-TV from 3 am to 6 am in the New York City metro area.  In 1989, HSN purchased a number of low-power TV stations and began operating the service 24 hours a day as Home Shopping SPREE. In 1997, the name was changed again to America's Jewelry Store to reflect a switch to exclusively selling jewelry. This incarnation met with limited success, so in 1998, the selection was expanded to include all of HSN's inventory categories, and the word jewelry was removed from the network's name. In 2003, AS was added to the DirecTV lineup.  

The low-power TV stations owned by HSN with partners and affiliated companies were located in every major metropolitan market – including a transmitter atop the World Trade Center until September 11, 2001.

Much of the merchandise presented by AS was distressed inventory from HSN, so the prices were usually dropped until liquidated or removed from air.

Competitor QVC had a spin-off channel called "Q2", which lasted only two years, from 1994 to 1996. Following Barry Diller's exit from QVC and purchase of HSN, many former Q2 employees followed him to HSN and America's Store.

Hosts
Home shopping hosts that appeared on America's Store at the time of its closure, some of whom were HSN hosts at that time, included (in alphabetical order):
Liz Benbrook
Tina Berry
Alyce Caron (now only at HSN)
Bill Green (now only at HSN)
Rich Hollenberg
Brian Hyder
Lori Leland (now only at HSN as a guest product expert)
Diana Perkovic (later only at HSN, where she left on December 13, 2013)
Alan Skantz (later only at HSN, where he left in 2011)
Perry Slater
Marlo Smith (now only at HSN)

Shopping networks in the United States
Defunct television networks in the United States
Television channels and stations established in 1988
Television channels and stations disestablished in 2007
IAC (company)
1988 establishments in the United States
2007 disestablishments in the United States